Viehbach is a village in the municipality of Fahrenzhausen in the district of Freising (Upper Bavaria, Germany).

History 
The small village is first mentioned in church records during the time of bishop Otto von Freising (1138-1158) as "Viehpach" or "Fichten am Bach" (Lit: Spruce Trees on the Creek). It was probably settled even earlier. An old Roman road leads from Passau to Augsburg between Viehbach and Westerndorf.

The name of the church in Viehbach (St. Laurentius) is first mentioned in a document in 1315. Local sources say that today's church was built on the foundations of a much earlier church. The village belonged to the district court of Kranzberg, while the church was under the control of the Diocese of Freising.

Viehbach appears in 1568 on a map by Philipp Apian during his Bavarian map project for Albrecht V. Duke of Bavaria.

Viehbach and its church were probably affected during the Thirty Years War, especially during the Swedish invasion of Bavaria in 1632, or even the French attack in the area in 1648. In 1669 new side altars were rebuilt in the church.

Viehbach and other villages were in danger by the Duke of Marlborough during the War of the Spanish Succession in July 1704. The villages of Viehbach and Bachenhausen recorded the looting and fires around them. When their houses were miraculously saved from destruction, they vowed to hold a mass every year on St. Florian's Day (May 4) to commemorate their liberation. The Annunciation can still be seen today in the old village church in Viehbach.

Viehbach has been part of the Fahrenzhausen community since the early 19th century. In 1817 the church recorded 118 believers in Viehbach, who lived in 26 houses. In 1868 a census by the Kingdom of Bavaria recorded 143 inhabitants and 55 buildings. In 1876 a census of the German Empire recorded 169 inhabitants and 56 buildings (including 43 horses and 180 cattle).

During the Second World War, units of the US Army passed through Viehbach and the surrounding area in April 1945 shortly before the liberation of Dachau and Munich.

Viehbach was part of a district reform program in the 1970s, in which the jurisdiction was transferred from Dachau to Freising.

In 2009 a solar park was built south of Viehbach (approx. 8000 m2 field).

In 2016 the shooting club SG "Gemütlichkeit" Viehbach-Bachenhausen e.V. opened a new facility in Viehbach.

In 2018 Viehbach had 465 inhabitants.

In 2020 proposals have been made to build a Children's Play Area between Viehbach and Bachenhausen, along the Rettenbach Creek.

Literature 

 Hans Schertl, "Kirchen und Kapellen im Dachauer Land (German)"

References

Freising (district)